Neverita duplicata, common name the shark eye, is a species of predatory sea snail, a marine gastropod mollusk in the family Naticidae, the moon snails.
  
In 2006, a paper was published which made it clear that a second, very similar, species with a smaller range of distribution also lives in part of the range inhabited by Neverita duplicata. The second species had previously been considered to be simply a form of N. duplicata, but it is now recognized as Neverita delessertiana.

Distribution
This is a common western Atlantic species. It is found from Massachusetts and other parts of New England, south to Florida and other states on the Gulf of Mexico, south to Honduras.

Description 
The color of the shell is variable, but is often a greyish brown. The central apex of the shell is often a dark blue in fresh shells, which can make the shell somewhat resemble an eye. On the underside, there is a large brown callus which partly blocks the umbilicus of the shell.

The maximum recorded shell length is 82 mm.

Gallery

Habitat 
This moon snail is found on sandy shores just below the low tide line. In most of its range, the empty shell is very commonly washed up on beaches, as also is the operculum and the sand collar.

The minimum recorded depth for this species is 0 m; the maximum recorded depth is 58 m.

Feeding habits
The shark eye (like all moon snails) is predatory, feeding mainly on bivalves buried in the sand. This snail drills a neat "countersunk" circular hole through the shell of its prey species, and then feeds on the soft tissue within.

References

Further reading 
 National Audubon Society Field Guide to North American Seashells

External links

 Neverita duplicata at Jax Shells
 Neverita duplicata, Gastropods.com, accessed 16 January 2011

Naticidae
Gastropods described in 1822